Osian (also spelt Osiyan) is an ancient town located in the Jodhpur District of Rajasthan state in western India. It is an oasis in the Thar Desert. The town is a panchayat village and the headquarters for Osian tehsil. The under-construction Amritsar Jamnagar Expressway passes through this town.

Osian is famous as home to the cluster of ruined Hindu and Jain temples dating from the 8th to 12th centuries. The city was a major religious centre of the kingdom of Marwar during the Gurjara Pratihara dynasty. Of the 18 shrines in the group, the Surya Temple, Sachiya Mata Temple, Katan Bawari and the Jain temple dedicated to Mahavira stands out in their grace and architecture.

The town was a major trading center at least as early as the Gupta period. It maintained this status, while also being a major center of Hinduism and Jainism for hundreds of year. This came to an abrupt end when the town was attacked by the armies of Muhammed of Ghor in 1195.
Osian is a famous tourist destination.

History

Evidence suggests that Osian is a very old settlement. Some of its early names include Uvasisala, Ukesa and Upkesapur-pattana. In its early history, the village was a center for Brahmanism. It was a major stop for camel caravans during the Gupta period. The town was an important center for the Gurjar Pratihar dynasty. Tradition states that, after being abandoned for a time, the village was re-established by Utpaladeva (c. 900-950). Utpaladeva converted to Jainism, and turned the village into a center for the religion. However, Jainism had a presence in the village long before that. The town was prosperous and successful at this time. At its peak, it had over one hundred temples.

A niche in Mahavira Temple contains a sculpture of intertwined snakes which also is worshipped by Oswal Jain, as adhisthatyaka - devetas. This leads us to believe that a sizeable part of the populace in that period may have belonged to naga extraction. Nagabhata II was a Pratihara ruler of Mandore near Jodhpur. It is said that the Nagabhata II must have defeated the nagas and so he must have been given the name Nagabhatta which means 'master of nagas'. 'Nagabhatta' the son of 'Narbhatta' of Mandore line established his capital at Merta near Nagaur, whose old name was Nagapura. The Pratiharas may have conquered these areas from the nagas. Nagapriyagachha of Jain also indicates the same direction.

Muhammad of Ghor and his Turkish and Muslim armies attacked the town in 1195. The people of the city fled during these attacks. Most of the city, and most of its temples, were destroyed. After this attack, the residents did not return, and the city became deserted.

The Jain Harivamsa Purana refers to Vatsaraja's rule in Saka year 705 (A.D. 783). It is believed that he was highly influential in Upakesapura (Osian), as inscriptions of Vikram Samvat dating back to 1013 (A.D. 956), and referring to this place, have been found.

Religion
 

It is conjectured from several pieces of evidence that the people of Osian become Jain by Acharya Ratnaprabhasuriji, who had impressed the populace of the region with his supernatural powers.

Osian is an important Jain pilgrimage center for the Maheshwari and Oswal Jain communities. The (Mahavira, महावीर) Temple, built here in A.D. 783, is an important tirtha for Jains built by Gurjara Pratihara King Vatsaraja.

The Nagas of Osian and the surrounding region, thus seem to have continued serpent worship even after their conversion to Jainism and for this reason, their parallel worship of Hindu goddess Sachiya Mata by the Oswal Jain community seems relevant.

The Sachiya Mata Temple also equally old and important situated on a hill north-east of Mahavira Temple, enable us some clues to understand the social history of that period. This Temple was built by Upaldev who is the brother of Raja Punj the son of King 'Bheemsain' (king of Bhinmal). This has many decorative features of a Jain temple. However, it is dedicated to Sachiya Mata, though Jains also worship here, which also is a matter of interest to understand the emergence of Jain community in this city.

The Shingavi, Baid, Bafna, Lunawat, Tated, Parekh, Karnavat and many other clans of Jain community conduct their 'Mundan-Sanskar' in Sachiya Mata Temple .

Demographics
In the 2011 India census, Osian reported 12,548 inhabitants, 6,572 of whom were male and 5,976 of female, which gave a gender ratio of 909 females per thousand males.

transport 
The nearest airport is at Jodhpur. State Highway 61 passes through Osian. Osian Railway Station is situated on the Jodhpur – Phalodi line of North Western Railway. Astonfield completed a five megawatt (MW) solar power plant in the town, which is the first industry in this holy town.

Gallery

Notable people

See also
 Oswal
 Bhinmal
 Mandore

References

External links
 

Temples in Rajasthan
Jain temples in Rajasthan
Cities and towns in Jodhpur district
Tourist attractions in Jodhpur district